This is a list of Bangladesh films that were released in 2003.

Releases

See also

2003 in Bangladesh
List of Bangladeshi films of 2004
List of Bangladeshi films
Dhallywood
Cinema of Bangladesh

References

External links 
 Bangladeshi films on Internet Movie Database

Film
Bangladesh
 2003